Giselle Loren is an American actress most known for her voice-over work in animation and video games. She voiced Adélie Chica in Happy Feet, Stargirl in Justice League Unlimited, and Martha Connors in Spider-Man.

She is perhaps best known for Buffy the Vampire Slayer for having voiced the character of Buffy Summers in two Buffy the Vampire Slayer video games (Buffy the Vampire Slayer and Buffy the Vampire Slayer: Chaos Bleeds). She also played Buffy in the unaired pilot episode of the Buffy the Vampire Slayer animated series.

Her live-action work has been limited so far. She appeared in the short film The Caretaker and also played the role of a female police officer in detective drama Nancy Drew in 2002.

Filmography

Producer 
 Black Batman: Batman Evolution (Black Batman: Evolution) - short Film TV (soon)

References

External links

Giselle Loren profile at whedon.info

Year of birth missing (living people)
Living people
American voice actresses
Place of birth missing (living people)